Jesse Lemond Anderson (born July 26, 1966) is a former professional American football player. A tight end, he played college football for the Mississippi State University Bulldogs. He was drafted into the National Football League (NFL) by the Tampa Bay Buccaneers in the fourth round of the 1990 NFL Draft, with the 87th overall pick. He and subsequently spent time with the Pittsburgh Steelers, the Green Bay Packers, and the New Orleans Saints before retiring in 1993.

References

1966 births
Living people
People from West Point, Mississippi
Players of American football from Mississippi
American football tight ends
Tampa Bay Buccaneers players
Pittsburgh Steelers players
New Orleans Saints players
Mississippi State Bulldogs football players